Eadberht I was king of Kent from 725 to 748. After his father Wihtred of Kent died, he inherited the kingdom of Kent along with his two brothers Æðelberht II and Alric. Æðelberht II seems to have been the eldest and dominant brother. Eadberht I died in 748, according to the Anglo-Saxon Chronicle. He left a son, Eardwulf, who succeeded as king jointly with his uncle.

His one complete surviving charter apparently dates from 14 October 727. Another charter is an altered copy of one issued by Æðelberht II. Other charters attributed to Eadberht I are copies of charters of Eadberht II with “deliberate chronological falsification”.

See also
List of monarchs of Kent

References

External links
 

748 deaths
Kentish monarchs
8th-century English monarchs
Year of birth unknown